The 2020–21 Southern Counties East Football League season was the 55th in the history of the Southern Counties East Football League, a football competition in England, and the fifth year the competition has had two divisions, the Premier Division and Division One, at Steps 5 and 6 respectively in the English football league system.

The allocations for Steps 5 and 6 for season 2020–21 were announced by the FA on 21 July, and were subject to appeal.

On account of the ongoing COVID-19 pandemic in England, the season was curtailed on 27 February along with all other leagues from Steps 3–6. The scheduled restructuring of non-League football took place at the end of the season, with new divisions added to the Combined Counties and the United Counties Leagues at Step 5 for 2021–22, along with an additional division in the Northern Premier League at Step 4. Promotions from Steps 5 to 4 and 6 to 5 were based on points per game across all matches over the two cancelled seasons (2019–20 and 2020–21), while teams were promoted to Step 6 on the basis of a subjective application process. As a result, three SCEL clubs were moved to the new Combined Counties Premier Division South.

Premier Division
The Premier Division comprised 21 teams, two more than the number which were still playing at the time of the abandonment of the previous season's competition:
 Balham – relocated from the Combined Counties League
 Tower Hamlets – relocated from the Essex Senior League

Premier Division table

Results table

Division One
Division One comprised the same 17 teams which were still competing when the previous season's competition was aborted.

Division One table

References

External links
 Southern Counties East Football League Official Website

2020-21
9
Association football events curtailed and voided due to the COVID-19 pandemic